Collection is a compilation by The Jam. It includes only one of the band's singles ("Just Who Is the 5 O'Clock Hero?") which was unreleased in the UK, as it focuses on the group's album tracks and B-sides.

Track listing
All tracks by Paul Weller

"Away from the Numbers" - 4:02
"I Got By in Time" - 2:05
"I Need You (For Someone)" - 2:40
"To Be Someone (Didn't We Have a Nice Time)" - 2:28
"Mr. Clean" - 3:27
"English Rose" - 2:46
"In The Crowd" - 3:17
"It's Too Bad" - 2:34
"The Butterfly Collector" - 3:08
"Thick as Thieves" - 3:37
"Private Hell" - 3:46
"Wasteland" - 2:50
"Burning Sky" - 3:26
"Saturday's Kids" - 2:51
"Liza Radley" - 2:27
"Pretty Green" - 2:34
"Monday" - 2:57
"Man in the Corner Shop" - 3:11
"Boy About Town" - 1:55 
"Tales from the Riverbank" - 3:32
"Ghosts" - 2:10
"Just Who Is the 5 O'Clock Hero?" - 2:13
"Carnation" - 3:24
"The Great Depression" - 2:51
"Shopping" - 3:23

Personnel

Vic Coppersmith-Heaven – Producer
Douglas Brothers – Photography
Derek d'Souza – Photography
Simon Halfon – Design
The Jam – Producer
Dennis Munday – Compilation Producer, Research
Chris Parry – Producer
John Reed – Liner Notes
Tony Taverner – Producer
Roger Wake – Digital Remastering
Pete Wilson – Producer

References

The Jam albums
1996 compilation albums
Polydor Records compilation albums